Murray John Finlay Luxton  (14 September 1946 – 16 November 2021) was a New Zealand National Party politician, serving as a Member of Parliament from 1987 to 2002. From 2008 to 2015, he was the Chairman of DairyNZ, the organisation that represents all New Zealand dairy farmers. He was co-chair of the Waikato River Authority, a Crown/iwi co-governance organisation established through Treaty of Waitangi settlement legislation to clean up the Waikato River.

Early life and family
Born in Morrinsville on 14 September 1946, Luxton was educated at Hamilton Boys' High School and Massey University (BAgSc, DipAgSc, DipBusSc, MMgt). His father, Jack Luxton, was a National Party MP from 1966 to 1987.

After an initial role as a Ministry of Agriculture dairy specialist, Luxton and his late wife Merryl went dairy farming. Periods of project consulting in Africa, Asia and the Pacific were interspersed with dairy farming in New Zealand over the following decade.

Member of Parliament

Luxton held Matamata until the 1996 election, when a boundary change caused him to stand in the seat of Karapiro. In the 1999 election, he opted to become a list MP, leaving the Karapiro seat to newcomer Lindsay Tisch.

Minister
The National Party won the 1990 election, and Jim Bolger became Prime Minister, Luxton was appointed to Cabinet. His ministerial roles have included Minister of Energy, Minister of Housing, Minister of Māori Affairs, Minister of Police, Minister of Commerce, Minister of Industry, Minister of Fisheries, Minister of Lands, Minister of Customs and Minister of Agriculture. He was also an Associate Minister of Education and of Overseas Trade. Luxton was regarded by many as one of the more economically liberal members of the National Party.

After politics
Luxton did not seek re-election in the 2002 election. He was one of the founders of the Open Country Cheese Company and the Kaimai Cheese Company, located near Matamata, in the Waikato, along with former colleague Wyatt Creech.

He held a number of directorships in the agribusiness sector including the Tatua Coop Dairy Company, having been a previous Chairman, and Wallace Corporation, and has farming interests. He was chair of DairyNZ, the New Zealand Dairy Industry Good organisation which represents all New Zealand dairy farmers, between 2008 and 2015. He was married to Mary Scholtens, QC.

He was for a short period (2005–06) a director of listed investment and property company Blue Chip, Luxton resigned from that Board. Luxton was appointed a Co-Chair of the Waikato River Authority and was a member of the New Zealand Constitutional Advisory Panel. He also sat on the boards of the Royal New Zealand Ballet Company and Landcare Research, one of the Crown Research Institutes. He was chair of the Asia NZ Foundation.

Luxton died in Wellington on 16 November 2021, after a long illness.

Honours
In the 2003 Queen's Birthday Honours, Luxton was appointed a Companion of the Queen's Service Order for public services. He was made a Companion of the New Zealand Order of Merit, for services to the dairy industry, in the 2017 New Year Honours.
Awarded Massey University's Sir Geoffrey Peren Medal 2013, Awarded D.Sc. by Lincoln University 2016.

See also
 Fourth National Government of New Zealand

References

 
 1990 Parliamentary Candidates for the New Zealand National Party by John Stringer p. 42 (New Zealand National Party, 1990)
Hon John Luxton at executive.govt.nz

1946 births
2021 deaths
Massey University alumni
Members of the Cabinet of New Zealand
Ministers of Housing (New Zealand)
New Zealand National Party MPs
New Zealand list MPs
People educated at Hamilton Boys' High School
People from Morrinsville
People from Matamata
Members of the New Zealand House of Representatives
New Zealand MPs for North Island electorates
Companions of the Queen's Service Order
Companions of the New Zealand Order of Merit
21st-century New Zealand politicians